Ocean Park may refer to:

Places

Settlements

United States
Ocean Park (Santa Monica), California
Ocean Park, Maine
Ocean Park Historic Buildings
Ocean Park, Oregon, adjacent to Beverly Beach
Ocean Park (Santurce), San Juan, Puerto Rico
Ocean Park Beach
Ocean Park, Washington

Other countries
Ocean Park, Surrey, British Columbia, Canada
Ocean Park, Uruguay

Oceanaria and amusement parks
Ocean Park Aquarium, Shark Bay, Western Australia
Ocean Park Hong Kong
Manila Ocean Park, Philippines
Ocean Park, an amusement park in BSD City, Indonesia

Railway stations
Ocean Park station, a metro station near Ocean Park Hong Kong
Ocean Park station (Staten Island Railway), New York, US

Other uses
Ocean Park (horse) (foaled 2008), a New Zealand Thoroughbred racehorse

See also
Ocean Parkway (disambiguation)